North Ipswich Reserve presently known as Qld Group Stadium and formally Bendigo Bank Oval due to naming rights is a sports venue in Ipswich, Queensland. Originally an Australian rules football (and later cricket) oval, it became a primarily rugby league venue in the 1920s as that code experienced an explosion in local popularity. It is currently home to the Ipswich Jets, who play in the Queensland Wizard Cup. On occasion the venue plays host to National Rugby League trial matches, most recently when the Sydney Roosters played the Jets.

In 2010 Brisbane Roar played an Ipswich invitation side made up of players from Ipswich Knights, Western Spirit FC and Ipswich City FC. Brisbane Roar also played Melbourne Victory in a pre-season game in 2013.

A $20 million redevelopment into a rectangular stadium configuration with capacity for over 20,500+ is currently proposed as part of an Ipswich City Council bid for bringing National Rugby League and A-League matches the city and as part of the Western Corridor NRL bid (Jets).

Past Sports Events

Australian rules football
In Australian rules football, the earliest recorded match at what was known as the North Ipswich Reserve was between Ipswich Grammar School and the newly formed Ipswich Football Club in 1870. The ground would serve as the Ipswich Football Club's homeground from 1870 through periods of dormancy in the 1890s and 1900s (appearing as a representative side for the city) until it switched to soccer around 1949. The Queensland Football Association (1880-1890) made regular use of the ground for matches, particularly intercolonials. It was home to the Queensland Australian rules football team for interstate tests against the New South Wales Australian rules football team in the 1890s, 1900s and 1920s. Many other prominent Australian rules matches were played there until the code's centre of popularity began to gradually shift from Ipswich to Brisbane in the 20th Century.

Rugby Union
The first recorded Rugby Union match at the ground was in 1878 upon insistence of the Brisbane Football Club which had switched to the code. Rugby was played sporadically on the ground in the years to follow including intercolonial matches in the 1880s.

Cricket
The ground has been used as a cricket venue since 1884. In 1885, cricket authorities assumed control over the ground and it became known as the North Ipswich Cricket Reserve. Following the turn of the century as it began to host a range of other sports it was known simply as the North Ipswich Oval.

Association Football (soccer)
Soccer matches have been played there since the turn of the 20th Century. Ipswich representative association football sides played the New Zealand national football team at North Ipswich Reserve in 1922, and the Chinese national football team in 1923  It was home to the Western Pride FC from the 2013 National Premier League Queensland for 2 years. Top level soccer returned in 2021 with an A-League Men's pre-season match.

Rugby League
Rugby league matches have been played there since 1910. In the 1980s it became home to the Ipswich Jets who enterred the Brisbane Rugby League premiership in 1986 attracting interest and crowds to the venue. More recently in 2003, 2008, 2011, 2012 and 2017, NRL trial matches there have averaged around 3,000 spectators a game. It has hosted the 2013 Queensland Rugby League Grand Final.

References

Sports venues in Queensland
Sport in Ipswich, Queensland
Soccer venues in Queensland
Rugby league stadiums in Australia
Rugby union stadiums in Australia
Ipswich Jets